Banque Financiere de la Cite v Parc (Battersea) Ltd [1998] UKHL 7 is an English unjust enrichment case, concerning the framework for a claim.

Facts
A company named Parc (Battersea) Ltd had got a loan from a bank called Royal Trust Bank (Switzerland), and given charge over its Battersea land as security. Parc Ltd got a second loan from  Omnicorp Overseas Ltd (which was part of the same group, and whose parent was managed by Mr Herzig), which got another charge. Banque Financiere de la Cite, a Swiss bank, gave Parc Ltd a third loan of DM30million but got no charge. Instead it got a ‘postponement letter’ saying other companies in the group (including OOL) would not enforce their charges until BFC had been paid. Parc Ltd used the loan to pay off RTB. But OOL had given no authority to Parc Ltd to give that letter. Parc Ltd went insolvent. BFC claimed subrogation to be paid in priority of OOL, but OOL contested.

Judgment
The House of Lords held that BFC should be subrogated in priority to OOL, because this was the ultimate intention of the letter, and otherwise OOL would be unjustly enriched by the advance of the loan.

Lord Hoffmann gave the leading speech and said that it is now:

Lord Hoffmann said the following on the principles behind liability in unjust enrichment.

Lord Steyn said the following.

Lord Griffiths concurred.

Lord Clyde agreed, saying the claim was based in unjust enrichment, or nemo debet locupletari aliena jactura. Lord Hutton also concurred.

See also
English unjust enrichment law

Notes

References

English unjust enrichment case law
House of Lords cases
1998 in British law
1998 in case law